Chin Liew Ten , also known as C. L. Ten, is Emeritus Professor of Philosophy and former Head of the Philosophy Department at the National University of Singapore. Before that, he was Professor of Philosophy (Personal Chair) and Acting Head of the School of Philosophy, Linguistics, and Bioethics at Monash University, Australia.

Biography
He was born in Malaysia, and is a graduate of the former University of Malaya (now National University of Singapore) in Singapore and of the London School of Economics. In 1967 he was a Recognized Student in Oxford University under the supervision of H. L. A. Hart. He was elected a Fellow of the Australian Academy of the Humanities in 1989, and a Fellow of the Academy of Social Sciences in Australia in 2000.

He has published on legal and political philosophy with an emphasis on issues of liberty and toleration, and especially on  John Stuart Mill.

He is on the editorial boards of several journals, including Australasian Journal of Philosophy, Utilitas, Journal of Political Philosophy, Bioethics and the Journal of Moral Philosophy.

Works
Mill on Liberty (Clarendon Press: Oxford 1980)
Crime, Guilt, and Punishment (Clarendon Press: Oxford 1987)
The Nineteenth Century (editor) (Routledge: London 1994)
Mill's Moral, Political, and Legal Philosophy (Ashgate: Aldershot 1999)
Was Mill a Liberal? (Marshall Cavendish: Singapore 2004)
Theories of Rights (Ashgate: Aldershot 2006).

External links
 Official university webpage

References

Alumni of the London School of Economics
Living people
Academic staff of the National University of Singapore
Malaysian people of Hakka descent
Singaporean people of Hakka descent
Malaysian emigrants to Singapore
Fellows of the Academy of the Social Sciences in Australia
Year of birth missing (living people)